Nichrome (also known as NiCr, nickel-chromium or chromium-nickel) is a family of alloys of nickel and chromium (and occasionally iron) commonly used as resistance wire, heating elements in devices like toasters, electrical kettles and space heaters, in some dental restorations (fillings) and in a few other applications.

Patented in 1906 by  Albert Marsh (US patent 811,859), nichrome is the oldest documented form of resistance heating alloy.

A common nichrome alloy is 80% nickel and 20% chromium by mass, but there are many other combinations of metals for various applications.

Properties 

Almost any conductive wire can be used for heating, but most metals conduct electricity with great efficiency, requiring them to be formed into very thin and delicate wires to create enough resistance to generate heat. When heated in air, most metals then oxidize quickly, become brittle and break. Nichrome wire, when heated to red-hot temperatures, develops an outer layer of chromium oxide, which is thermodynamically stable in air, is mostly impervious to oxygen, and protects the heating element from further oxidation.

Nichrome alloys are known for their high mechanical strength and their high creep strength. The properties of nichrome vary depending on its alloy. Figures given are representative of typical material and are accurate to expressed significant figures. Any variations are due to different percentages of nickel or chromium.

Uses 

Because of its low cost of manufacture, strength, ductility, resistance to oxidation, stability at high temperatures, and resistance to the flow of electrons, nichrome is widely used in electric heating elements in applications such as hair dryers and heat guns. Typically, nichrome is wound in coils to a certain electrical resistance, and when current is passed through it the Joule heating produces heat.

Nichrome is used in the explosives and fireworks industry as a bridgewire in electric ignition systems, such as electric matches and model rocket igniters.

Industrial and hobby hot-wire foam cutters use nichrome wire.

Nichrome wire is commonly used in ceramic as an internal support structure to help some elements of clay sculptures hold their shape while they are still soft. Nichrome wire is used for its ability to withstand the high temperatures that occur when clay work is fired in a kiln.

Nichrome wire can be used as an alternative to platinum wire for flame testing by colouring the non-luminous part of a flame to detect cations such as sodium, potassium, copper, calcium, etc.

Other areas of usage include motorcycle mufflers, in certain areas in the microbiological lab apparatus, as the heating element of plastic extruders by the RepRap 3D printing community, in the solar panel deployment mechanism of spacecraft LightSail-A, and as the heating coils of electronic cigarettes.

The alloy price is controlled by the more expensive nickel content. Distributor pricing is typically indexed to market prices for nickel.

See also 

 Chromel
 Constantan
 Hastelloy
 Inconel
 Kanthal

References 

Nickel–chromium alloys
Refractory metals
Firelighting using electricity
Nickel alloys
Electric heating